The statutory accounting principles are a set of accounting rules for insurance companies set forth by the National Association of Insurance Commissioners. They are used to prepare the statutory financial statements of insurance companies. Statutory Accounting Principles are designed to assist state insurance departments in the regulation of the solvency of insurance companies. Although there are minor state-by-state variations, they are the basis for state regulation throughout the United States.

The rules are issued as discussion drafts, and public comments are solicited, before they are codified in the NAIC Accounting Practices and Procedures Manual.

See also
 Generally Accepted Accounting Principles (United States)
 Statutory reserve

References

External links  
 NAIC Official Website
 Statutory Accounting Principles Working Group
 Risk Management and Financial Reporting Practice of the American Academy of Actuaries

Insurance in the United States
Accounting in the United States